Masdevallia decumana, the good-looking masdevallia, is a species of orchid in the genus Masdevallia.

References

decumana